Glyphostoma gabbii, common name Gabb's tooth turrid, is a species of sea snail, a marine gastropod mollusc in the family Clathurellidae.

Description

Distribution
G. gabbii can be found in Atlantic waters, ranging from eastern Florida to Brazil., in the Caribbean Sea, the Gulf of Mexico and the Lesser Antilles.

References

 G., F. Moretzsohn, and E. F. García. 2009. Gastropoda (Mollusca) of the Gulf of Mexico, pp. 579–699 in Felder, D.L. and D.K. Camp (eds.), Gulf of Mexico–Origins, Waters, and Biota. Biodiversity. Texas A&M Press, College Station, Texas

External links
 

gabbii
Gastropods described in 1889